AS Monaco won Division 1 season 1981/1982 of the French Association Football League with 55 points.

Overview

Twenty teams competed in the league – the top eighteen teams from the previous season, as well as two teams promoted from 1980–81 French Division 2. The competition was contested in a double round robin format, with each club playing every other club twice, for a total of 38 rounds. Two points were awarded for wins and one point for draws.

League table

Promoted from Division 2, who will play in Division 1 season 1982/1983
 Toulouse FC:Champion of Division 2, winner of Division 2 group A
 FC Rouen:Runner-up, winner of Division 2 group B
 FC Mulhouse:Third place, winner of barrages against US Valenciennes-Anzin

Results

Relegation play-offs

|}

Top goalscorers

References

 Division 1 season 1981-1982 at pari-et-gagne.com

Ligue 1 seasons
France
1